Luciano Narsingh (born 13 September 1990) is a Dutch professional footballer who plays for Ekstraklasa club Miedź Legnica. He is right-footed and usually plays as a right winger but can also play as a left winger, and both side of attacking midfield. Since 2012, he has also played for the Netherlands national team, whom he represented at that year's European Championship.

Club career

Heerenveen
In 2008 Narsingh signed a contract with SC Heerenveen till 2013. He made his official debut on 29 October 2008 in the Eredivisie under trainer Trond Sollied. He replaced the injured Danijel Pranjić in a 2–0 loss against Vitesse. A month later he was allowed to play in the away match against FC Twente (6–0 loss). In the 2009–2010 season Narsingh also came in action twice. The following year, however, he made his breakthrough under coach Ron Jans and Narsingh grew into a sensation in the Eredivisie because of his dribbling skills, speed and passing movements and drove Roy Beerens from the first eleven. In the 2011–12 Eredivisie, Narsingh set up 20 goals, meaning he gave most assists in the Eredivisie that year. On 15 July 2012, SC Heerenveen and Dutch giants PSV Eindhoven reached an agreement to transfer the young talent to Eindhoven for an amount of €4.1 million.

PSV

The first half of Narsingh's first season started with the forward six goals and five assists and PSV comfortably led the table with eleven wins out of thirteen games played. Later in the season however Narsingh suffered a serious ligament injury against NAC Breda that would keep him out for the rest of the season. When Narsingh came back to playing form in October 2013, Dick Advocaat had been replaced by Phillip Cocu as head coach who refused to gamble on Narsingh and didn't give him much playing time. In the 2014 against the defending champions Ajax Narsingh completed his recovery by first set up Memphis Depay for the equalizer and then scoring himself in a surprise 3–1 win.

On 18 April 2015, Narsingh set up the opening goal within three minutes for Luuk de Jong and then scored the final goal as PSV defeated Heerenveen 4–1 to win their 22nd Eredivisie title, and first since 2008.

Swansea City
On 12 January 2017 Narsingh signed for Premier League club Swansea City for a fee of £4 million. He scored once, the winner against Watford before the club confirmed on 18 May 2019 that he will be released when his contract expired.

Feyenoord
On 5 July 2019 Narsingh signed a 2-year contract with the Eredivisie club Feyenoord. He scored his first goal for the club in a 4–0 win against FC Dinamo Tbilisi in the third qualifying round of the 2019–20 Europa League.

Twente (loan)
On 22 January 2021, Narsingh was sent on a six-month loan deal to division rivals Twente.

International career
Born in the Netherlands, Narsingh is of Indo-Surinamese descent. In February 2012, Luciano Narsingh was called up for the first time by Bert van Marwijk to represent the senior Netherlands football team for the game against England at Wembley. On 7 May, he was named in the provisional list of 36 players for the UEFA Euro 2012 tournament, one of nine uncapped players to be chosen by manager Bert van Marwijk as part of the preliminary squad. He was handed his unofficial international debut in a friendly match against Bayern Munich, during which he scored once. He made the final cut of 23 players to represent the Netherlands at the tournament. He made his official debut in a friendly match against Slovakia on 30 May.

Narsingh scored his first international goal in a 4–2 defeat to Belgium on 15 August 2012. He was involved in the Netherlands' qualification for the 2014 World Cup in Brazil, scoring once and giving three assists in four games, until his injury. Narsingh was not able to participate in the World Cup due to his injury and his spot was taken by Leroy Fer.

Career statistics

Club

International goals
Netherlands tallies go first, scores indicate each Narsingh goal.

Honours

Club
PSV
 Eredivisie (2): 2014–15, 2015–16
 Johan Cruijff Schaal (2): 2012, 2015

Individual
 Most assists in the Eredivisie in the 2011–12 campaign (22)

References

External links

 Luciano Narsingh at Voetbal International 
 

1990 births
Living people
Footballers from Amsterdam
Dutch footballers
Dutch expatriate footballers
Netherlands youth international footballers
Netherlands under-21 international footballers
Netherlands international footballers
Association football wingers
Dutch sportspeople of Surinamese descent
SC Heerenveen players
PSV Eindhoven players
Jong PSV players
Swansea City A.F.C. players
Feyenoord players
FC Twente players
Sydney FC players
Miedź Legnica players
Eredivisie players
Eerste Divisie players
Premier League players
English Football League players
A-League Men players
Ekstraklasa players
III liga players
UEFA Euro 2012 players
Expatriate footballers in Wales
Dutch expatriate sportspeople in Wales
Expatriate soccer players in Australia
Dutch expatriate sportspeople in Australia
Expatriate footballers in Poland
Dutch expatriate sportspeople in Poland